Pezuela is a barrio in the municipality of Lares, Puerto Rico. Its population in 2010 was 474. The barrio is divided into about 8 sectors. The barrio has been prone to landslides since Hurricane Maria struck in 2017.

History
Puerto Rico was ceded by Spain in the aftermath of the Spanish–American War under the terms of the Treaty of Paris of 1898 and became an unincorporated territory of the United States. In 1899, the United States Department of War conducted a census of Puerto Rico finding that the population of Pezuela barrio was 1,010.

In late 2019, 12 landslides occurred in one month's time as a result of heavy rainfall and some homes were in danger of collapsing near PR-131. Residents stated the problem was caused by years of inaction to correct and clear waterways after Hurricane Maria, which struck in 2017. The people fear that a large landslide could occur and cause many deaths as happened with the Mameyes Landslide in Portugués Urbano barrio in Ponce in 1985.

Sectors
Barrios (which are roughly comparable to minor civil divisions) and subbarrios, in turn, are further subdivided into smaller local populated place areas/units called sectores (sectors in English). The types of sectores may vary, from normally sector to urbanización to reparto to barriada to residencial, among others.

The following sectors are in Pezuela barrio:

See also

 List of communities in Puerto Rico
 List of barrios and sectors of Lares, Puerto Rico

References

External links

Barrios of Lares, Puerto Rico